North West Water was a water supply, sewage disposal and sewage treatment company serving North West England. It was established as the North West Water Authority in 1973, and became North West Water plc in 1989, as part of the privatisation of the water industry in England and Wales. In 1995, it merged with NORWEB (the former North Western Electricity Board) to form United Utilities.

North West Water Authority
The North West Water Authority was one of ten regional authorities created by the Water Act 1973. It was formed from the merger of statutory water undertakings, local sewerage boards and three river authorities, these being the Mersey and Weaver River Authority, the Lancashire River Authority and the Cumberland River Authority. 

The water undertakings subsumed into North West Water authority included:

Municipal corporations
Bolton Corporation
Carlisle Corporation
Liverpool Corporation
Manchester Corporation
St. Helens Corporation
Widnes Corporation

Water boards

The sewage treatment, sewerage and water supply and distribution arms of the authority were privatised in July 1989, becoming North West Water plc. The remaining regulatory functions of the authority, including pollution prevention, fisheries management, flood control, water resource management and a number of other ancillary functions, were transferred to the newly formed National Rivers Authority.

The water supply sewage disposal and sewerage assets, which were previously held by the water authority and covered some 56,000 hectares (220 sq miles), were transferred to North West Water at privatisation.

References

Former water companies of England
Former nationalised industries of the United Kingdom
Companies based in Cheshire